Tazeh Shahr (also Romanized as Tāzeh Shahr; formerly, Kuhnen Shahr) is a city in the Central District of Salmas County, West Azerbaijan province, Iran. At the 2006 census, its population was 8,216 in 1,783 households. The following census in 2011 counted 8,864 people in 2,255 households. The latest census in 2016 showed a population of 8,629 people in 2,385 households. The city is populated by Azerbaijanis.  

The city sustained damage in the 1930 Salmas earthquake.

References 

Salmas County

Cities in West Azerbaijan Province

Populated places in West Azerbaijan Province

Populated places in Salmas County